Ray Hunt may refer to:

 C. Raymond Hunt, American sailboat designer
 Ray Hunt (horse trainer) (1929–2009), American horse trainer and clinician
 Ray Lee Hunt (born 1943), American heir and businessman
 Ray Hunt (footballer) (born 1918), Australian rules footballer
 Ray C. Hunt (1920–1996), guerrilla leader in the Philippines during World War II. 
 Raymond Hunt (1921–1994), New Zealand cricketer